Rubin Statham (born 25 April 1987), often referred to by his nickname of "José," is a professional tennis player from New Zealand. His twin brother Mikal (usually referred to by his nickname of "Oliver") is also a professional tennis player. He has reached a ATP career high ranking of 279 in singles as of 25 February 2013, and 139 in doubles as of 17 June 2013.

Career

2005
In June 2005, Statham's second year on the professional tour, he made his first final at the Japan F8 tournament. He lost in the final to Go Soeda of Japan 4–6, 3–6. In November 2008, Kyu Tae Im of Korea defeated him 6–7(3), 1–6 in the final of the Malaysia F2 event. This was the second time he had made a final in over three years. In May 2009 Statham won his first tournament, at Australia F3, defeating Australian Greg Jones 4–6, 6–4, 6–1 in the final. In his next tournament, Australia F4, he lost in the final to Jones 5–7, 6–7(6). He won his next tournament in Egypt F7 by defeating Jean-Noel Insausti of France in the final 7–5, 6–2. He made it four finals in a row in his next tournament at Egypt F8, losing to Karim Maamoun of Egypt in the final 2–6, 2–6.

2009
In October 2009 Statham won another Futures title at Thailand F4. He defeated Roman Jebavý of the Czech Republic 6–3, 2–6, 7–5 in the final, having also won the doubles title the day before. He also won the Vietnam F1 title in the same month, defeating Amir Weintraub of Israel 6–7(4), 7–6(4), 6–1 in the final, and again made it a special event by winning the doubles as well. He was do it again in Korea in May 2013.  In October 2010, Statham was the only New Zealand representative in the Men's Singles at the 2010 Commonwealth Games and was the sixth seed. He lost in the quarterfinals to top-seeded and eventual champion Somdev Devvarman of India 3–6, 4–6.

2019-2020
In January 2019 Statham played the ASB Classic in Auckland, where he caused a major upset by beating the 6th seed and 25th ranked player in the world at the time, Hyeon Chung in straight sets 7–5, 6–3.

In March 2020, Statham's win in the World Group I play-off was his first competitive match for more than a year, a serious hip injury having caused him to retire from the first round of a Challenger event in Bangkok in February 2019.  Other than purely domestic events, such as the New Zealand Premier League and Te Anau Invitational, it was the only match he played during the year.

Davis Cup
With 33 ties, Statham holds the record number of appearances in the Davis Cup for New Zealand, his debut being in 2005. 
His 28 singles victories in those 33 ties is also the highest number by a New Zealand player.

In March 2020, Statham's won against Brandon Perez in the World Group I play-off against Venezuela.

Challenger and Futures/World Tennis Tour Finals

Singles: 26 (12-14)

Doubles: 66 (22 titles, 44 runners-up)

Davis Cup (49)

   indicates the outcome of the Davis Cup match followed by the score, date, place of event, the zonal classification and its phase, and the court surface.

References

External links
 
 

1987 births
Living people
New Zealand male tennis players
Tennis players from Auckland
Tennis players at the 2010 Commonwealth Games
Commonwealth Games competitors for New Zealand